Crab Trap is a 2009 Colombian-French drama film directed by Oscar Ruiz Navia. The film was selected as the Colombian entry for the Best Foreign Language Film at the 83rd Academy Awards, but it did not make the final shortlist.

Plot
Daniel arrives in the Afro-Colombian community of La Barra on Colombia's Pacific coast, looking for a boat to leave the country. He intends to stay for only a few days, but a strange shortage of fish has affected La Barra and the fishermen have been sailing far out to sea in hopes of finding new resources. These circumstances make Daniel's search more difficult. In the meantime, the villagers have their own issues: Cerebro, the leader of the community, is trying to adjust to the advent of modernity.

Cast
 Arnobio Salazar Rivas as Cerebro
 Rodrigo Vélez as Daniel

See also
 List of submissions to the 83rd Academy Awards for Best Foreign Language Film
 List of Colombian submissions for the Academy Award for Best Foreign Language Film

References

External links

2009 films
Spanish drama films
2000s Spanish-language films
2009 drama films
Colombian drama films